I Don't Care Where I Go When I Die is the debut studio album by American hardcore band Gaza. The album was released on October 3, 2006 through Black Market Activities and Metal Blade Records. It is the last release by the band with bassist Chris Clement.

Critical reception

Max Deneau of Exclaim! praised the album, stating that the band "left an otherwise mediocre year for Metal Blade and its subsidiaries on a much more positive, extremely atonal note."

Stewart Mason of AllMusic said that the album sounded "genuinely scary in a way that many grindcore bands would never be able to manage."

Track listing

Personnel
Gaza
 Jon Parkin – vocals
 Michael Mason – guitar
 Luke Sorenson – guitar
 Casey Hansen – drums
 Chris Clement – bass

Additional personnel
 Nicholas Zampiello – production and mastering
 Trevor Strnad – additional vocals on track 9

References

2006 debut albums
Black Market Activities albums
Metal Blade Records albums
Gaza (band) albums